St. Beauty is an American musical duo consisting of singers Alexe Belle and Isis Valentino. The duo is affiliated with a larger artistic collective called Wondaland Art Society, a group of musicians that also includes Janelle Monáe, Jidenna, Roman GianArthur, and Deep Cotton. Both the duo and the collective are based in Atlanta, Georgia.

Career
Belle and Valentino met while working at a clothing boutique that held a showcase for local artists in 2012. In light of the acclaim they received after the performance, the two officially formed a band and selected the name St. Beauty. In a recent interview, the duo explained that they selected the name because, "St. Beauty is a pure beauty that lives in everyone." Their mission is "to heal and inspire."

St. Beauty's song "Going Nowhere" appeared on the album, Wondaland Presents: The Eephus. The album was released on August 14, 2015, and was distributed by Epic Records. The album debuted at No. 5 on the Billboard Chart for R&B/Hip-Hop Albums. In November 2017, St. Beauty toured as an opening act for Jhené Aiko's Trip Tour.

In 2018, the group released their debut extended play Running to the Sun, featuring the singles "Caught" (2017), "Not Discuss It" (2018) and "Borders" (originally released in 2016).

Discography

Extended play

Singles

As lead artist

As featured artist

Guest appearances

References

American musical duos
American hip hop groups
Musical groups from Atlanta